Pablo Antonio Vega Mantilla (17 August 1919, Nagarote, León Department – 14 November 2007) was the Roman Catholic Bishop of Juigalpa, Nicaragua, from 30 April 1991 until 29 October 1993.  He then served as the Bishop Emeritus of the Diocese of Juigalpa until his death on 14 November 2007.

External links
Catholic Hierarchy: Bishop Pablo Antonio Vega Mantilla †

1919 births
2007 deaths
People from León Department
20th-century Roman Catholic bishops in Nicaragua
Place of death missing
Roman Catholic bishops of Juigalpa